Michael Watt (born 13 April 1987) is a former Ireland men's field hockey international. Between 2006 and 2016 Watt made 201 appearances and scored 54 goals for Ireland. He was a member of the Ireland team that won the bronze medal at the 2015 Men's EuroHockey Nations Championship. He also represented Ireland at the 2016 Summer Olympics. At club level, Watt has won the Irish Senior Cup with Instonians, the Scottish Hockey Cup with Grange and the Men's Irish Hockey League with Lisnagarvey. He also played and scored for both Grange and Surbiton in the Euro Hockey League.

Early years, family and education
Between 1998 and 2005 Watt attended the Royal Belfast Academical Institution. In addition to playing field hockey at RBAI, Watt also played rugby union for the school. Between 2005 and 2009 he attended Heriot-Watt University were he gained a BSc in Real Estate Management. His older brother, Johnny, a graduate of Trinity College Dublin, played rugby union for Ireland at schoolboy and university levels.

Domestic teams

RBAI
In 2002–03, together with Mark Gleghorne, Watt was a member of the Royal Belfast Academical Institution team that won the Burney Cup and finished as runners-up in the All Ireland Schoolboys Hockey Championship. In 2003–04, together with Paul Gleghorne and John Jackson, he was a member of the RBAI team that won the McCullough Cup, the Burney Cup and the All Ireland Schoolboys Hockey Championship.

Instonians
Watts began playing for Instonians while still attending RBAI. In 2003–04, together with Mark and Paul Gleghorne,  Watt was a member of the Instonians team that won the Irish Senior Cup, defeating Cork Harlequins 1–0 in the final. In 2018 Watt re-joined Instonians.

Grange
Between 2005 and 2009, while attending Heriot-Watt University, Watt played for Grange in the Scottish Hockey National League. He was a Grange player when he made his senior debut for Ireland. He also played and scored for Grange in the 2007–08 Euro Hockey League. In 2008–09 Watt scored 17 goals for Grange, including two in the Scottish Hockey Cup final as they defeated Inverleith 4–0. He was also named the Scottish Hockey Union Player of the Year.

KHC Dragons
During the 2009–10 season Watt played for KHC Dragons in the Men's Belgian Hockey League. Watt also helped coach KHC Dragons youth teams.

RS Tenis
Between 2010 and 2012 Watt played for RS Tenis in the División de Honor de Hockey Hierba. His team mates at RS Tenis included fellow Ireland international, Geoff McCabe. Watt also helped coach RS Tenis youth teams.

SCHC
During the 2012–13 season Watt played for SCHC in the Hoofdklasse. His team mates at SCHC included fellow Ireland international, Conor Harte. Watt also helped coach SCHC youth teams.

Surbiton
Between 2013 and 2015 Watt played for Surbiton in the Men's England Hockey League. He also played and scored for Surbiton in the 2013–14 Euro Hockey League.

Lisnagarvey
In 2015 Watt joined Lisnagarvey. In 2015–16, along with Jonathan Bell, Sean Murray and Paul Gleghorne, Watt was a member of the Lisnagarvey team that won the Men's Irish Hockey League and the EY Champions Trophy. Watt and Lisnagarvey also reached the final of the Irish Senior Cup but lost to Monkstown after a penalty shoot-out.

Hampstead & Westminster
Between 2016 and 2018 Watt played for Hampstead & Westminster in the Men's England Hockey League.

Ireland international
Between 2006 and 2016 Watt made 201 appearances and scored 54 goals for Ireland. He made his senior debut for Ireland in July 2006, aged  19, against Poland. In his first major tournament, the 2008 Men's Field Hockey Olympic Qualifier, he scored twice in the opening 4–0 win against France. Watt was a member of the Ireland team that won the 2011 Men's Hockey Champions Challenge II. He also helped Ireland win Men's FIH Hockey World League tournaments in 2012 and 2015. Watt was also a member of the Ireland team that won the bronze medal at the 2015 Men's EuroHockey Nations Championship. He also represented Ireland at the 2016 Summer Olympics. He made his last appearance for Ireland at the 2016 Summer Olympics and in November 2017 he announced his official retirement from the team.

Occupation
Between 2013 and 2018 Watt was based in the West End of London where he worked as a surveyor, firstly for the Central London Agency later for Matthews & Goodman. In 2018, together with his  brother, Johnny, he returned to Belfast to work for Fred J. Malcolm, a jewellery firm.

Honours
Ireland
Men's FIH Hockey World League Round 1
Winners: 2012 Cardiff
Men's FIH Hockey World League Round 2
Winners: 2015 San Diego
Runners up: 2013 New Delhi
Men's Hockey Champions Challenge II
Winners: 2011
Runners up: 2009
Men's Field Hockey Olympic Qualifier
Runners up: 2012
Men's Hockey Investec Cup
Runners up: 2014
Lisnagarvey
Men's Irish Hockey League
Winners: 2015–16: 1
EY Champions Trophy
Winners: 2016: 1
Irish Senior Cup
Runners up: 2015–16: 1
Grange
Scottish Hockey Cup
Winners: 2008–09: 1
Instonians
Irish Senior Cup
Winners: 2003–04: 1
RBAI
All Ireland Schoolboys Hockey Championship
Winners: 2003–04: 1
Runners up: 2002–03: 1
Burney Cup
Winners: 2002–03, 2003–04: 2
McCullough Cup
Winners: 2003–04: 1

References

1987 births
Living people
Irish field hockey coaches
Ireland international men's field hockey players
Male field hockey players from Northern Ireland
Irish male field hockey players
British male field hockey players
Olympic field hockey players of Ireland
Field hockey players at the 2016 Summer Olympics
División de Honor de Hockey Hierba players
Men's Hoofdklasse Hockey players
Men's England Hockey League players
Men's Irish Hockey League players
Instonians field hockey players
KHC Dragons players
SCHC players
Surbiton Hockey Club players
Lisnagarvey Hockey Club players
Hampstead & Westminster Hockey Club players
Male field hockey forwards
Sportspeople from Belfast
Expatriate field hockey players
Irish expatriate sportspeople in Belgium
Irish expatriate sportspeople in England
Irish expatriate sportspeople in Scotland
Expatriate sportspeople from Northern Ireland in Spain
Expatriate sportspeople from Northern Ireland in the Netherlands
Irish rugby union players
People educated at the Royal Belfast Academical Institution
Alumni of Heriot-Watt University
Men's Belgian Hockey League players